Actinoleuca campbelli is a species of sea snail or true limpet, a marine  gastropod mollusc in the family Lottiidae, one family of true limpets.

Subspecies
Subspecies within this species include:
 Actinoleuca campbelli bountyensis
 Actinoleuca campbelli macquariensis

References
 Powell A. W. B., William Collins Publishers Ltd, Auckland 1979 

Lottiidae
Gastropods of New Zealand
Gastropods described in 1880
Taxa named by Henri Filhol